Wells Fargo Place (30 East 7th Street) is an office tower in St. Paul, Minnesota, United States. It was designed by Winsor/Faricy Architects, Inc. and WZMH Architects, and is 37 stories tall. The building opened in September 1987, a month ahead of schedule and under budget. It is a concrete and steel structure, with a facade of brown-colored granite and glass. The granite came from Finland. The building contains 156 underground parking spaces. It was formerly known as The Minnesota World Trade Center. Anthrosphere, a large sculpture by Paul Granlund, is in the lobby.

The tower houses offices used by Wells Fargo, who renamed the building Wells Fargo Place on May 15, 2003. It also houses the headquarters of the Minnesota State Colleges and Universities System. The building was designed for the 36th and 37th floors to be used as a restaurant with a dedicated elevator between the floors. While built to design, including the dedicated elevator, this was never implemented and the space was divided up into storage lockers that are listed for lease on their website.

The building was developed by Oxford Properties Inc, the design architect was WZMH, the general contractor was PCL, and the permanent lender was Principal of Des Moines, Iowa. Windsor Faricy was the local production architect.

Tenants
AgriBank
Arch Insurance Group
Microsoft
Minnesota State Colleges and Universities System - Suite 350
Merrill Lynch
Internal Revenue Service
Wells Fargo
 Video Update (closed 2003)

Broadcasting

FM

See also

List of tallest buildings in Minnesota

References

External links 
 Official Website

Skyscraper office buildings in Saint Paul, Minnesota
World Trade Centers
WZMH Architects buildings
Office buildings completed in 1987
1987 establishments in Minnesota